The 1973 Saint Louis Billikens men's soccer team represented Saint Louis University during the 1973 NCAA Division I men's soccer season. The Billikens won their record-breaking tenth NCAA title this season. It was the sixteenth ever season the Billikens fielded a men's varsity soccer team. This was the most recent season the Billikens have won a national title.

Review

Schedule 

|-
!colspan=6 style=""| Regular season
|-

|-
!colspan=6 style=""| NCAA Tournament
|-

|-

References 

 Results

Saint Louis Billikens men's soccer seasons
1973 NCAA Division I soccer independents season
Saint Louis
NCAA Division I Men's Soccer Tournament-winning seasons
NCAA Division I Men's Soccer Tournament College Cup seasons